Josiah Kirby Lilly Sr.  (November 18, 1861 – February 8, 1948), nicknamed "J. K.," was an American businessman,  pharmaceutical industrialist, and philanthropist who became president and chairman of the board of Eli Lilly and Company, the pharmaceutical firm his father, Colonel Eli Lilly, founded in 1876. Josiah, the colonel's sole heir, began working at his father’s company at the age of fourteen. He graduated from the Philadelphia College of Pharmacy and Science and became superintendent of the Lilly laboratories in 1882 and company president in 1898. Under his leadership, the company introduced standardized manufacturing processes, expanded its sales force, and increased its research efforts to develop new drugs. Eli Lilly and Company grew into one of the largest and most influential pharmaceutical corporations in the world, and the largest corporation in Indiana. Lilly’s eldest son, Eli Jr., succeeded him as president in 1932. His younger son, Josiah Jr. ("Joe"), succeeded Eli as company president in 1948. J. K. served as chairman of the board from 1932 until his death in 1948.

Lilly was also a philanthropist who supported the projects of charitable and civic organizations in Indianapolis and in Indiana. Lily and his two sons established the Lilly Endowment in 1937 with Eli Lilly and Company stock valued as $280,000. It became one of the largest charitable foundations in the world, and today continues the Lilly family's legacy of philanthropy. Lilly also amassed a significant collection of composer Stephen Foster's music and Foster memorabilia, which he donated to the University of Pittsburgh in 1937.

Early life and education
Josiah Kirby Lilly, the only son and heir of Eli Lilly, a pharmacist, and Emily (née Lemen) Lilly, was born on November 18, 1861, in Greencastle, Indiana. Eli, who enlisted in the Union army in 1861 and was later promoted to colonel, was away at war at the time of his son's birth. Josiah's father returned home before reenlisting and first saw him in 1863.

Josiah, later called "J. K." had an "unsettled childhood." Because of his father's business interests, he frequently moved. Colonel Lilly remained in the South after the American Civil War, relocating his family to a Mississippi cotton plantation in 1865. Josiah and his parents were stricken with a mosquito-born disease, probably malaria, in 1866. Josiah and his father recovered, but his mother died on August 20, 1866, eight months pregnant with a second son, who was stillborn. Josiah's devastated father abandoned the plantation and let it fall into disrepair. Colonel Lilly filed bankruptcy in 1868. In the meantime Josiah returned Greencastle and lived with his grandparents, Gustavus and Esther Lilly, while his father attempted to reverse his financial difficulties and find other employment.

Josiah's father found work as a pharmacist and drugstore proprietor in Greencastle and Indianapolis, Indiana, before opening a pharmacy in Paris, Illinois. Colonel Lilly married Maria Cynthia Sloan in 1869, and young Josiah soon joined his father and stepmother in Illinois, where they remained until the family moved to Indianapolis in 1873.

On May 10, 1876, Colonel Lilly founded his own pharmaceutical manufacturing business, which became known as Eli Lilly and Company, at 15 West Pearl Street in Indianapolis. Josiah, who was aged fourteen at the time was among its first employees. He had quit school to work in the laboratory of his father's company as an apprentice and errand boy. Within a few years Eli Lilly and Company became a very successful business that was known for manufacturing high-quality prescription drugs, especially gelatin- and sugar-coated pills and capsules and fruit-flavored elixirs. By 1879 company sales had grown to $48,000 ($ in 2015 chained dollars).

In 1880 Colonel Lilly sent Josiah to the Philadelphia College of Pharmacy (now known as the University of the Sciences) to increase his son's technical expertise so he could help develop the family business. Josiah graduated from the school in 1882, and returned to Indianapolis, where his father soon named him superintendent of the Lilly manufacturing laboratory, a position that J. K. held until in 1898 when he became company president.

Marriage and family
During his college years, J. K. met and became engaged to Lilly Ridgley of Lexington, Kentucky. The couple married on November 18, 1882. Their eldest son, Eli Jr., was born on April 1, 1885, at the family's home on North Tennessee Street (renamed Capitol Street on 1895). When Eli was about eight years old the family moved to a home on North Pennsylvania Street, where a second son, Josiah Jr. (Joe), was born on September 25, 1893. J. K. acquired   of property north of Indianapolis in what became the Crows Nest neighborhood in 1928. His wife, Lilly, who suffered from pernicious anemia, eventually became an invalid and died on April 19, 1934. In 1935 seventy-three-year-old J. K. married Lila Allison Humes, a fifty-one-year-old widow. Lila was also the sister of Ruth Allison Lilly, Eli Jr.’s wife. J. K. and Lila had no children. She died in 1971.

In addition to their main residence in Indianapolis, the Lilly family maintained a cottage at Lake Wawasee in Kosciusko County, Indiana. J. K.'s father had built one of the summer resort’s first cottages from 1886–87 and founded the Wawasee Golf Club in 1891. J. K. built his own family cottage, called Anchors Aweigh, on the Lilly’s lakeside estate across the road from the golf club from 1936–
38.

In 1927 Lilly had a Tudor Revival-style, private performance hall built in the orchard and had a custom-built pipe organ installed. He initially named the building Melodeon Hall, but renamed it Foster Hall in the 1930s as a tribute to composer Stephen Foster. In the mid-1960s the Lilly family donated the property, including the music hall, to the Park School for boys. The present-day Park Tudor School is located on the property and continues to use the hall.

Career

Early career
In the early 1880s, while J. K. was superintendent of Eli Lilly and Company's laboratory, it began manufacturing Succus Alterans, a treatment for venereal disease, types of rheumatism, and skin diseases that became the company's first widely successful product. The growing company rapidly expanded, adding new employees and relocating to larger quarters in a complex of buildings at McCarty and Alabama Streets, south of downtown Indianapolis, in 1881. By 1890, when J. K. became de facto head of the company, it had grown into one of the largest in Indiana and had several hundred employees. Among Lilly's employees were his young sons, Eli and Joe, who ran errands and performed other odd jobs after school. Around 1890 J. K. assumed day-to-day management of the business and Colonel Lilly retired to focus on charitable and civic pursuits. Under J. K.'s leadership the company flourished, despite the tumultuous economic conditions of the 1890s.
It survived an economic recession and continued to grow as it made several successful technological advances in its manufacturing processes, such as automation of its capsule production, and focused on research and mass production of high-quality, medicinal drugs.

Company president

After Colonel Lilly died in 1898, J. K  became president of the family's pharmaceutical business and heir to the family fortune. J. K. continued to grow the business, which saw considerable growth during the 1910s. The company continued to advance production automation, while its research department made small advances. During his tenure as president, the company introduced standardized manufacturing processes, expanded the company's sales force, and increased research efforts to develop new drugs. One of its most significant projects occurred in 1922 when he signed an agreement on behalf of the company to form a partnership with a Toronto firm, Connaught Anti-toxin Laboratories, that resulted in the first commercial, mass-production of insulin. The Lilly company's trademarked name for its new product was Iletin, which it began to distribute in 1923.

Lilly's two sons followed their father into the family business. His eldest son, Eli, succeeded him as president in 1932; J.K. continued as its chairman of the board and focused more of his time on philanthropy. Following J. K's death in 1948, Eli became chairman of the board (1948–53 and 1966–69) and honorary chairman (1953–66 and 1969–77); J. K.'s younger son and namesake, Josiah Jr. (Joe), served as president (1948–53) and chairman of the board  (1953–66).

Later years
In the 1930s, after his retirement from day-to-day operations of Eli Lilly and Company, J. K. pursued several personal and philanthropic interests. He became an orchid breeder and began collecting Stephen Foster music compositions and Foster memorabilia. He maintained his extensive collection at Melodeon Hall (renamed Foster Hall), his private performance hall and library in Indianapolis.

Philanthropist
Lilly was "a lifelong benefactor" to Indianapolis and active in many philanthropic organizations, including the Indianapolis Commercial Club, the local YMCA, Crown Hill Cemetery, the Indiana Historical Society, and the James Whitcomb Riley Memorial Association. J. K. served as board chairman of the Indianapolis Foundation and supported the Indianapolis Symphony Orchestra, the Children's Museum of Indianapolis, the city's Community Fund, Tuberculosis Association, Wheeler Rescue Mission, and the Red Cross. Lilly also served as a trustee of Purdue University and the Philadelphia College of Pharmacy. He was a member of the Orchid Society of California.

Lilly Endowment

In 1937 Lilly and his sons, Eli and Joe, founded the Indianapolis-based Lilly Endowment with an initial contribution of Eli Lilly and Company stock valued at $280,000. J. K. served on the board and became its largest contributor, while his son, Eli,  managed the private family endowment for its first twelve years. Over time J. K. made contributions of Eli and Lilly Company stock worth a total of $86.8 million, including a $30 million bequest following his death in 1948; his two sons contributed stock with a combined value of $6.8 million. In 1998 the Lilly Endowment became the largest philanthropic endowment in the world in terms of assets (estimated value of $15.4 billion) and charitable giving. Others have surpassed it, but it remains among the top five, as of 2014, in terms of total assets ($9.96 billion).

Music collection
Lilly was known for his extensive collection of composer Stephen Foster's music. In December 1933, he published Foster Hall Reproductions, a collection of 224 facsimiles of Foster's sheet music. The publication has been described as the first Gesamtausgaben ("collected works") of an American musical artist. According to author Mariana Whitmer in American Music, Lilly's response to what he viewed as a "small and distorted" sample of Foster recordings, led to his commission of Foster Hall Recordings, a ninety-six-disc set that contained "the complete works of Stephen Foster as ... known in 1933." Lilly donated his Foster Hall collection to the University of Pittsburgh in 1937. Fletcher Hodges Jr., whom Lilly hired to help with the Foster collection, curated the university's Foster archive at its Stephen Foster Memorial for fifty-one years. The archival collection contained approximately 30,000 documents as of 2006.

Death and legacy
Lilly died on February 8, 1948, at the age of eighty-six. His estate was valued at $6.5 million at the time of his death. He is buried at Crown Hill Cemetery in Indianapolis.

Lilly's son, Eli, donated his father's home in Indianapolis's Crows Nest neighborhood, as well as his own to Indiana University. Eli also provided the university with a $1 million endowment to maintain the two properties.

J. K.'s legacy at Eli Lilly and Company included the introduction of uniform standards for manufacturing products, a significant increase its sales staff (more than 500 percent), and establishing its first branch offices in New York and New Orleans. In 1905, during his tenure as president, the company reached $1 million in sales. Lilly's son, Eli, joined the family business in 1907, and succeeded J. K. as company president in 1932. Lilly's son, Joe, joined the firm in 1914 and succeeded his brother, Eli, as company president in 1948.

In 1921, during J. K.'s tenure as president, Eli Lilly and Company obtained the rights to mass produce insulin, in cooperation with University of Toronto scientists, once the production methods were perfected and approved. The product's debut in 1923, while his son, Eli Jr. was company president, began an era of numerous new product introductions and manufacturing improvements that increased company profits and achieved the company national and international recognition.

Eli Lilly and Company grew into one of the largest pharmaceutical companies in the world. Under J.K. Lilly's leadership, as well as his two sons and their successors, the company developed many new innovations, including advancements in the mass production of medicines, the pioneering development of insulin during the 1920s, mass production of penicillin during the 1940s, and polio vaccine in the 1950s. In later years the company introduced innovations in antibiotics, such as Ceclor, and antidepressants, such as Prozac, and diversified into agricultural chemicals, animal-health products, and beauty products, among other product lines. According to Forbes, it ranked as the 243rd largest public company in the world in 2016, with sales of $20 billion and a market value of $86 billion (USD).

J. K.'s legacy is also evident in his company’s charitable work. He established the Lilly tradition of providing aid to disaster victims. While he was company president, Eli Lilly and Company sent medicine and supplies to the victims of the 1906 San Francisco earthquake and fire. He also set a company precedent in 1919 that continued during the Great Depression. Instead of layoffs, which most companies did to cut expenses, Lilly's company reduced employee work hours, but increased wages to compensate for the loss of income.

One of J.K.'s and his two sons' greatest legacies was the establishment of the Lilly Endowment in 1937. In 1998 the family's charitable foundation became the largest philanthropic endowment in the world in terms of assets and charitable giving. As of 2014, it ranked fifth on a list of the largest charitable foundations in total assets ($9.96 billion) and ranked twenty-first in total giving ($333.6 million).

Honors and tributes
Lilly was the recipient of the Remington medal in 1942, which was awarded to and individual who "contributed most during the year to the advancement of the profession of pharmacy or whose contributions over a period of years are worthy of recognition," .

Lilly is featured in the Indiana Historical Society exhibition, "You Are There: Eli Lilly at the Beginning," at the Eugene and Marilyn Glick Indiana History Center in Indianapolis. The exhibition (October 1, 2016, to January 20, 2018) includes a recreation of the first Lilly laboratory on Pearl Street in Indianapolis and a costumed interpreter portraying a teenaged J. K. Lilly.

References

Sources
 
 
 
 
 
 
  From

Further reading

External links
 Eli Lilly and Company, official website
 
 Lilly Endowment, Inc., official website
 (Finding aid for the Foster Hall Collection at the University of Pittsburgh)

1861 births
1948 deaths
American philanthropists
Philanthropists from Indiana
Indiana Republicans
People from Greencastle, Indiana
Businesspeople from Indianapolis
Presidents of Eli Lilly and Company
Burials at Crown Hill Cemetery